Christopher William Dodsley (born 4 April 1978) is a former English cricketer. Dodsley was a right-handed batsman who bowled right-arm medium pace. He was born in Gateshead, Tyne and Wear.

Dodsley represented the Durham Cricket Board in a single List A match against Buckinghamshire in the 2nd round of the 2002 Cheltenham & Gloucester Trophy which was played in 2001. In his only List A match, he scored an unbeaten 1 run.

References

External links
Christopher Dodsley at Cricinfo
Christopher Dodsley at CricketArchive

1978 births
Living people
Cricketers from Gateshead
English cricketers
Durham Cricket Board cricketers